Hanya Yanagihara (born 1974) is an American novelist, editor, and travel writer. She grew up in Hawaii. She is best known for her bestselling novel A Little Life, which was shortlisted for the 2015 Booker Prize, and for being the editor-in-chief of T Magazine.

Early life 
Hanya Yanagihara was born in 1974 in Los Angeles. Her father, hematologist/oncologist Ronald Yanagihara, is from Hawaii, and her mother was born in Seoul. Yanagihara is partly of Japanese descent through her father. As a child, Yanagihara moved frequently with her family, living in Hawaii, New York, Maryland, California and Texas. She attended Punahou High School in Hawaii. She attended Smith College and graduated in 1995. 

Yanagihara has said that her father introduced her as a girl to the work of Philip Roth and to "British writers of a certain age", such as Anita Brookner, Iris Murdoch, and Barbara Pym. Of Pym and Brookner, she says, "there is a suspicion of the craft that the male writers of their generation didn't have, a metaphysical reckoning of what is it actually doing for the world". She has said that "the contemporary writers I admire most are Hilary Mantel, Kazuo Ishiguro, and John Banville".

Career 
After college, Yanagihara moved to New York and worked for several years as a publicist. She wrote and was an editor for Condé Nast Traveler.

Her first novel, The People in the Trees, partly based on the real-life case of the virologist Daniel Carleton Gajdusek, was praised as one of the best novels of 2013.

Yanagihara's A Little Life was published in March 10th, 2015, and received widespread critical acclaim. The book was shortlisted for the 2015 Man Booker Prize for fiction, the 2016 Women's Prize for Fiction and won the 2015 Kirkus Prize for fiction. Yanagihara was also selected as a finalist for the 2015 National Book Award in Fiction. A Little Life defied the expectations of its editor, of Yanagihara's agent, and of the author herself, that it would not sell well.

Yanagihara described writing the book at its best as "glorious as surfing; it felt like being carried aloft on something I couldn't conjure but was lucky enough to have caught, if for just a moment. At its worst, I felt I was somehow losing my ownership over the book. It felt, oddly, like being one of those people who adopt a tiger or lion when the cat's a baby and cuddly and manageable, and then watch in dismay and awe when it turns on them as an adult".

In 2015, she left Condé Nast to become a deputy editor at T: The New York Times Style Magazine. She has said that after she published her best selling sophomore novel, people in the publishing industry were baffled by her decision to take a job at T. Describing the publishing world as "a provincial community, more or less as snobby as the fashion industry", she said, "I'd get these underhanded comments like, 'oh, I never knew there were words [in T Magazine] worth reading'". Of working as an editor while writing fiction on the side, she says, "I've never done it any other way". In 2017, she became the editor-in-chief of T.

Yanagihara's third novel, To Paradise, was published in January 11th, 2022, and reached number one on The New York Times best seller list.

Awards and honours 

 A Little Life: Winner of 2015 Kirkus Prize for Fiction
 A Little Life: Shortlisted for the 2015 Booker Prize
 A Little Life: Finalist for the 2015 National Book Award for Fiction
 A Little Life: Shortlisted for the 2016 Women's Prize for Fiction

Works and publications 
 The People in the Trees, 2013
 A Little Life, 2015
 To Paradise, 2022

References

External links 

 Interview on Meet The Writers with Georgina Godwin at Soundcloud

21st-century American women writers
21st-century American non-fiction writers
21st-century American novelists
American women novelists
American women travel writers
American travel writers
American magazine writers
American magazine editors
American women editors
American novelists of Asian descent
American writers of Japanese descent
American writers of Korean descent
American women writers of Asian descent
Novelists from Hawaii
Writers from New York City
Kirkus Prize winners
Punahou School alumni
Smith College alumni
Living people
1974 births